Spy Groove (also known as SG) is an American adult animated series that aired for one season on Teletoon Detour in Canada and for six episodes on MTV in the United States. It premiered on June 26, 2000 and ended on July 13, 2002.

Spy Groove was created by Michael Gans, Richard Register and Kevin Thomsen, who also wrote and performed the voices for the show. The general plot is about two suave yet cocky secret agents, Agent #1 and Agent #2, and their boss, Helena Troy, who assigned them their missions. Like the tone of MTV's animated programs, Spy Groove is consistently tongue-in-cheek and often employs fast-paced banter between the protagonists. It also features a number of pop songs in some episodes at the time of its broadcast.

Background and artistic style
Co-creators Michael Gans and Richard Register were comedy duo performers before becoming writers and utilized their fast-paced rapport in the show based on their acts. The end credits sequence shows the protagonists (voiced by Gans and Register) chat and bicker together on topics irrelevant to the events of each episode, which was the only use of improvisation from the voice actors.

The "Spy Groove" aesthetic is based on artist Glen Hanson's style, who was the art director and designed the characters and settings. It is basic and shiny, with brilliant colours and dark lines. Because of Hanson's caricature work, many characters are modelled after celebrities including Agent #1 and Agent #2, who were modelled after Matt Damon and Ben Affleck, respectively.

As a homage to classic cartoons, most of the animation is limited to lip-synching, facial expressions, some movements and action scenes, as characters are often still in most scenes of each episode.

Voice cast and characters

Main Characters 

 Michael Gans as Agent #1
 Richard Register as Agent #2
 Fuschia! as Helena Troy
 Jessica Shaw as Mac
 Dean Wein as the Narrator

Villains 

 Erin Quinn Purcell as Sierra Nevada
 Garet Scott as the Contessa
 Koko Austin as Champagne Du Jour

Minor/one-off characters 

 Kevin Thomsen as Dr. Ken, Hector Blanco, General, Captain and Priest
 Maryann Towne as herself
 Maggie Gans as Bunny von Schnickle and Sonya
 Alison Fraser as Mimi LeVerne and Kathy Lee Gifford
 Julie Halston as Dandelion Splendorface
 Yoshi Amao as Benni and Jaianto Enjin
 Maria Helan Lopez as Margarita Blanco
 Robyn Weiss as Jo Melekelikimaka
 Blair Ross as Windy La Tette
 Ilyana Kadushin as Tasha
 Kei Arita as Kyoko
 Penny Cococafe as Lovely
 Emily Newman as Ashley Perelips
 Lilli Lavine as Melissa Rivers
 Carolyn McDermott as Vegas dealer
 Penny Papachristofilogiannoloulos as Traci Momandpopadopolis
 Shane Guenego as Sailor
 Nadya Ginsburg as various voices

Episodes
 Move Over Miami (Villain: Mr. Fish)
 Ski Cats (Villain: The Contessa)
 Virtual Vegas (Villains: Johnny Nevada/ Sierra Nevada)
 Queen of DeNile (Villain: Champagne Du Jour)
 Greek Freaks (Villains: Xerxes twins)
 Spanish on the Fly (Villain: Julio Blanco)
 Malibooboo (Villain: Connie Lola Andrea LeTete)
 Cyberberian Sexpress (Villains: Napoleon Pushkin/Sierra Nevada)
 Sneaky Tiki Taboo (Villain: Nick Nack/The Big Bahoner)
 Tokyo Takedown (Villain: Grandmama San's grandson)
 Brazilian Brew-Ha-Ha  (Villain: Leo Macho Grande)
 Snap, Crackle, Popillon (Villain: Marquis De Guy)
 Manhattan Glam Chowder (Villain: Mr. Fish)

Gadgets
The Agents were equipped with high-tech toys disguised as more mundane items. However, keeping with the tone of the series the gadgets often contained various features, functions, and stylish trademarks that often ranged from convenient to the ridiculously useless (at least until the story-line made the item useful). Some examples include:

A pane of windshield glass that collapses down into a book of matches.
A corkscrew bottle-opener/thermo-coil/hummingbird feeder.
Digital, MP3 downloading divining rod (from the Sharper Image)
Cocktail drink coaster/two-way communicator with digital holographic projection capability.
Inflatable Life-sized Ricky Martin decoy.
"Dry-Spy" optional car modification. Converts a lime green convertible into a lime green submarine.

Villains
The majority of the Spy Groove villains are of the sort found in most secret agent fare. However very few were interested in global domination, but instead obsessed with some little slice of modern culture. For example, a plan to get all top 10 of the most eligible Hollywood bachelors (as defined by Blather magazine) married so that poor #11 would finally get noticed. Or to get every coffee drinker in the world addicted to the villains' own special blend.

Some of the Spy Groove villains include:
Mr. Fish: a former hypnotist who did guest spots on the old Sonny and Cher Show, now obsessed with becoming the absolute creator of the fad of the week. He once tried to destroy Miami by causing a tidal wave, then donating some nearby swampland he had bought to the dispossessed citizens to make New Miami, and then using their gratitude towards him to let him hypnotize them with Bavarian Slap-dancing to a salsa beat. Once hypnotized the people of the international fad capital would adopt whatever fad he told them to, and thus... so would the world.
Rock Debris: a taciturn and irritable mercenary for hire for several of the Spy Groove villains. He specialized in blowing things up and looking cranky. He's memorable because he was probably the most often seen rogue in the gallery.
Sierra Nevada: daughter of a wealthy casino tycoon, and herself a robotics genius. She and Agent Number One are star-crossed lovers a la Batman and Catwoman as they both possess intellects that the other can respect. Her robots are often lifelike and are mistaken for the people they resemble.
The Marquis de Guy: the other Prince of Perve (wrestler Goldust being the first one), this Champagne Magnate has an affection for S and M and a few other letters best not considered. He schemed with Mimi Laverve to unleash genetically engineered butterflies to destroy the grape crops of the world's sparkling white wine giants so that whenever anyone toasts the new year, they must toast with him (or at least with his champagne).

References

External links
 
 Glen Hanson, Animation Director

2000 American television series debuts
2002 American television series endings
2000s American adult animated television series
American adult animated action television series
English-language television shows
MTV cartoons
Espionage television series